The following is a list of unproduced David Gordon Green projects in roughly chronological order.  During his long career, American film director David Gordon Green has worked on a number of projects which never progressed beyond the pre-production stage under his direction.  Some of these productions fell in development hell or were cancelled.

2000s

Untitled Science Fiction film
In September 2001, Green told The Guardian that one of his future projects was a sci-fi flick in the vein of Tarkovsky. In a 2011 interview, when asked about his sci-fi epic, Green said "That's the best script I've ever read. My buddy George Smith, who's one of the writers on my cartoon series Good Vibes, wrote it. I'd want to direct it or support it or produce it."

Untitled Western film
Another project Green discussed was a script about heroin addicts in the Wild West. Later, in 2011, Green said, "Nobody will finance that shit. I've been trying to get that made for ten years."

A Confederacy of Dunces
In November 2002, it was announced that Green was to helm a film adaptation of John Kennedy Toole's A Confederacy of Dunces for Miramax Films, which bought the film rights to the novel from Paramount Pictures in June that same year.  Will Ferrell was to have portrayed Ignatius J. Reilly and Lily Tomlin, Drew Barrymore, Mos Def and Olympia Dukakis were to have co-starred.  The script was written by Steven Soderbergh and Scott Kramer.  It was reported in 2003 that Barrymore's production company Flower Films was to co-produce the film with Warner Bros.  Principal photography was planned to occur in New Orleans in 2004.  The film never came to fruition.  It has been said that Hurricane Katrina played a factor in the film's cancellation.

The Secret Life of Bees

In March 2003, it was reported that Green was planning to direct a film adaptation of Sue Monk Kidd's The Secret Life of Bees.  Then, in 2004, it was announced that Green will write and direct the film for Focus Features, with Lauren Shuler Donner serving as producer.  A film was eventually released in 2008 without Green's involvement.

Fat Albert

Green admitted in a July 11, 2003 interview with MTV News that he wanted to direct a live action film adaptation of Bill Cosby's Fat Albert and the Cosby Kids.  Green stated, "I’ve had two goals as far as movies are concerned forever that I can remember. One of them was to [make] Dunces, and [then] more than anything in the whole world, I really wanna do Fat Albert.  I got really depressed because they were about to go into production on Fat Albert a year ago with Forest Whitaker directing, so I was super pissed."  After Whitaker dropped out of Fat Albert, Green campaigned to direct the film.  Green was unsuccessful.  The film was instead directed by Joel Zwick and released in 2004.

The Precious Few
It was reported on July 25, 2003 that Green was working on a script of a film titled Precious Few.  Green co-wrote the script with Danny McBride.  It has been said that the film is about demolition derbies.  The Independent reported that had the film been greenlighted, Green was to have cast Paul Schneider as "a gay mechanic named Tess."    Green said of the project in 2011, "I would love to (make it).  We’ve been around for a couple years trying to get it financed. Yeah that would be our flagship film if we can find a great international financier. I wrote it with my buddy when I was all drugged up on painkillers after having jaw surgery and somehow, in six days, we cranked out something we were really proud of.”

Shockproof Sydney Skate
It was reported in 2004 that Sydney Pollack hired Green to write a film adaptation of Marijane Meaker's Shockproof Sydney Skate.  Pollack was going to direct the film, but his death in 2008 caused it to be shelved.

Lord Vishnu's Love Handles
Variety reported in July 2004 that Green was attached to direct a film adaptation of Will Clarke's Lord Vishnu's Love Handles: A Spy Novel (sort of).  The film  was to have been distributed by Paramount, but it never came to fruition.  Green said of the project in 2011, "It got turned around. I think that kind of disappeared."

Untitled James "Bubba" Stewart biopic
In 2005, Green attempted to make an untitled biopic about the life of James "Bubba" Stewart.

Nerd Camp
Green stated in a 2005 interview with IndieWire that he was writing a script of a film titled Nerd Camp and that Seann William Scott was to star in it.  Green later said in a 2006 interview that the film was "about a summer camp for geniuses.”  The film was to have been distributed by Universal Pictures.  When asked about the fate of Nerd Camp in 2011, Green responded, "They took it away from me and Danny (McBride) before anybody knew who we were and had some other guy write it."

The Innocent Man
It was announced in 2007 that Green was to write and direct The Innocent Man for Warner Independent Pictures and Smoke House Pictures.  The film was to have been based on John Grisham's non-fiction book about Ron Williamson titled The Innocent Man: Murder and Injustice in a Small Town.  According to Green, the film was shelved due to "legal problems."

One in the Chamber
Green reported in 2008 he and Darius Shamir wrote a script titled One in the Chamber.  According to Green, the script is about "a guy going to get his kidnapped son out of prison."  Green later stated in 2011 that he did not want to direct the film. Variety reported in 2017 that Oceanside Media will produce the film and that Shamir will direct it.  Variety further described it as about "an ex-Marine who finds himself deep in the jungles of Asia searching for his son who has been taken hostage by the most dangerous man in Cambodia."

Six Pack
The New York Times reported in August 2008 that Green was working on a remake of the 1982 film Six Pack.  It was later reported in 2012 that Green would write and direct the film for 20th Century Fox.  The film was never made.

Suspiria

The New York Times also reported in August 2008 that Green completed a script for the remake of the 1977 film Suspiria.  Green reportedly co-wrote the script with Chris Gebert.  In 2009, Empire reported that Green would shoot the film in 2010.  In April 2012, it was announced that Crime Scene Pictures would produce the film.  It was also reported that principal photography was to begin in September 2012.  Isabelle Fuhrman was slated to play the lead in Green's remake.  In addition to Fuhrman, Isabelle Huppert, Janet McTeer, Michael Nyqvist and Antje Traue were also to have appeared in the film.  Green reported in 2013 that the film was in development hell due to legal issues.  In 2015, it was confirmed that Green will not direct the film.  Instead, Luca Guadagnino replaced Green and the film was released in 2018.

Freaks of the Heartland
It was announced in October 2008 that Green was to direct a film adaptation of Steve Niles' Dark Horse graphic novel Freaks of the Heartland for Overture Films.  Green reported in 2011 that the film might be animated.  It was reported in 2016 that Green, if available, was attached to produce and direct a television series based on Freaks of the Heartland for MTV.

2010s

Battling Boy
In May 2010, it was announced that Paramount Pictures hired Green and Josh Parkinson to rewrite the Battling Boy script.  The project was to have been based on Paul Pope's graphic novel of the same name. On July 29, 2015, The Tracking Board reported that Patrick Osborne replaced Green as director of Battling Boy, while Green co-wrote the screenplay with Josh Parkinson.

Free Country
It was also announced in May 2010 that Green was eyeing to direct Parkinson's first original screenplay titled Free Country. The story was described as "a thriller with comedic elements."

Barefoot Bandit/Taking Flight
It was reported in July 2010 that Green was to produce and direct Barefoot Bandit for 20th Century Fox.  It was to have based on Taking Flight: The Hunt for a Young Outlaw, a nonfiction book by Bob Friel about the life of Colton Harris Moore.  The script was written by Dustin Lance Black.  In 2012, it was announced that Green dropped out of the project.

Black Jack pilot
In March 2011, it was revealed that Green would direct the pilot episode of the series “Black Jack,” and produce the series through Rough House for Comedy Central.

Ice Station Zebra
Green announced in April 2011 that he expressed interest in doing a remake of the 1968 film Ice Station Zebra, adding that he wrote a script for the remake for Warner Bros.

Untitled 1960s musical
In April 2011, Green also revealed a dream project of his about rival musical families in Branson, Missouri in the 1960s, adding that "If someone called me up and asked if I wanted to do Seven Brides for Seven Brothers I'd jump to the front of the line for that."

Q
In November 2011, it was announced that Green would write and direct a film adaptation of Evan Mandery's Q for Columbia Pictures.  The film was to have been produced by Matt Tolmach and Pouya Shahbazian.

Little House on the Prairie
It was reported in 2012 that Green was in talks to direct a film based on Laura Ingalls Wilder's Little House on the Prairie for Sony Pictures.  Abi Morgan was to have written the script.  Scott Rudin was to serve as producer.  Green left the project in 2014 when it was announced that Sean Durkin will direct the film.

Hit the Road Jack
In a 2013 interview with the Special Broadcasting Service, Green expressed interest in remaking his film Prince Avalanche (2013) in Australia as an action movie and title it Hit the Road Jack.  It would also have been the second remake of the 2011 Icelandic film Either Way.

The Line
In 2014, it was announced that Green was going to direct Chris Pine in a thriller film titled The Line.  According to Variety, the film is about "a border patrol agent who, after recently losing his wife and child, goes on the run with a boy whose family was recently killed by the cartel. He soon finds out both sides of the law have their sights on him and the boy."  The script was written by Sang Kyu Kim.

Score
In May 2014, Green was attached to direct Score, which was written by Don Johnson, who also would have starred.

Newsflash
In 2017, it was announced that Green was to direct Seth Rogen in Newsflash.  The film is a dramatization of Walter Cronkite's news coverage of the assassination of President John F. Kennedy.  Cronkite was to have been portrayed by Rogen.  Green left the project in favor of directing Halloween Kills instead.

Friday Night Lights
In 2018, it was announced that Green was in talks of directing a reboot of Friday Night Lights based on Buzz Bissinger's Friday Night Lights: A Town, a Team, and a Dream.  Green backed out of the project in 2019 due to scheduling conflicts.

Hogan’s Heroes sequel series
In September 2019, it was revealed that Green’s company Rough House, Village Roadshow Pictures and Albert S. Ruddy will produce the sequel series to Hogan's Heroes about the descendants of the original characters teaming up for a treasure hunt.

References

Green, David Gordon